"Pool Hall Richard" is a song and single by British group, Faces and written by group members, Rod Stewart and Ronnie Wood. It was produced by Mike Bobak and Ron Nevison.

Despite appearing on the picture sleeve, Ronnie Lane does not appear on either side of the single, having quit the band in June 1973, before it was recorded in early July and released as a single that December. Instead, guitarist Ronnie Wood plays bass on the A-side, while Lane's permanent replacement Tetsu Yamauchi plays bass on the live B-side, recorded at the Reading Festival in August 1973. Yamauchi played his first live dates with the Faces in July 1973, but did not officially join the band until after "Pool Hall Richard" had been recorded.

Release and chart performance

The single was released in the UK in 1973 on the Warner Brothers label with the Motown song I Wish It Would Rain as the B-side. It made number 8 in the UK chart in 1973, staying on the chart for 11 weeks.

Reception
AllMusic critic, Stephen Thomas Erlewine, described the song as "a bar-room stomper".

References

1973 songs
Songs written by Rod Stewart
Songs written by Ronnie Wood
1973 singles
Faces (band) songs
Warner Records singles